Edward Charles Rainsford (born 14 December 1984) is a Zimbabwean cricket commentator and former cricketer. He has played 39 One Day Internationals and two Twenty20 Internationals for Zimbabwe. His sister, Yvonne Rainsford is a Zimbabwean cricketer who was also a member of the first Zimbabwe women's cricket team when they made their international debut in 2006.

Career

Domestic career
Rainsford played two matches for the Gloucestershire Second XI in the Second XI Championship in 2008, taking five wickets at an average of 35.20, with a best of 3/56.

International career

Rainsford represented the Zimbabwe Under-19 cricket team at the 2004 Under-19 World Cup, taking four wickets in six games at an average of 38.00, with a best of 2/37.

He is primarily a right arm medium-fast seam bowler with a 22.03 first-class average whose skill in yorkers is well documented.

During the 2006 Zimbabwean tour of Bangladesh, he left the tour early to fulfil a club contract in England with North London side Harefield CC. He took 33 wickets in 17 games, including a spectacular 4 wickets in 4 consecutive balls.

Edward Rainsford was ruled out of the World Cup 2011 due to an ankle injury, he was sent to fly home.

References

External links

1984 births
Centrals cricketers
Cricketers at the 2007 Cricket World Cup
Cricketers at the 2011 Cricket World Cup
Living people
Midlands cricketers
Mid West Rhinos cricketers
Zimbabwean cricketers
Zimbabwe One Day International cricketers
Zimbabwe Twenty20 International cricketers
Zimbabwean cricket commentators
Sportspeople from Kadoma, Zimbabwe